Friday 13th EP is a four-track EP by English rock band the Damned, issued as the result of a one-off deal with the NEMS Records label. It was released on 13 November 1981, which fell on a Friday.

The EP was released in the UK and Sweden on 7" vinyl, and also in Germany on 12" vinyl. In 1981, EPs were still eligible for the UK Top 75 Singles chart, and Friday 13th reached No. 50.

The lead-off track, "Disco Man", was featured on many compilations, also becoming a live favourite. Two of the other three tracks, "Billy Bad Breaks" and "Limit Club", were composed by the band; the final track was a cover version of The Rolling Stones song "Citadel". "Limit Club" was a tribute to the late Malcolm Owen of The Ruts.

Track listing
All songs written by Rat Scabies, Captain Sensible, Paul Gray and Dave Vanian, except where noted.
 "Disco Man"  – 3:20
 "Limit Club"  – 4:15
 "Billy Bad Breaks"  – 3:53
 "Citadel" (Mick Jagger, Keith Richards)  – 2:48

Personnel
The Damned
 Dave Vanian − vocals
 Captain Sensible − guitar, keyboards, backing vocals
 Rat Scabies − drums
 Paul Gray − bass
    
Technical personnel
 Tony "Broozer" Mansfield − production
 Paul Cobbold − engineering

Cover Design
 Linda Roast

Chart positions

References

The Damned (band) albums
1981 debut EPs
Friday the 13th
Albums recorded at Rockfield Studios
Albums produced by Tony Mansfield